The 2017 ADAC TCR Germany Touring Car Championship was the second season of touring car racing to be run by the German-based sanctioning body ADAC to the TCR regulations. The series will run predominantly in ADAC's home nation Germany. As a support category to the ADAC GT Masters series, the championship will also take in races in the neighbouring nations of Austria and the Netherlands.

Josh Files successfully managed to defend his title, beating Mike Halder in Race 1 of the Hockenheim.

Teams and drivers

Calendar and results
The 2017 schedule was announced on 23 November 2016, with two events scheduled to be held outside Germany. The second Oschersleben round will support the International Series along with ADAC Formula 4, while the rest of the rounds will be part of the ADAC GT Masters weekends.

Championship standings

Drivers' Championship

Scoring systems

Teams' Championship

Notes

References

External links
 

2017 in German motorsport
Germany Touring Car Championship